Phillip E. Allen is an American Electrical Engineer.

Biography
Phil Allen obtained his Ph.D. through University of Kansas in 1970. After graduation he worked in numerous well-known companies such as Delco, Lawrence Livermore Laboratory, Lockheed, Pacific Missile Range, Texas Instruments, and Schlumberger Well Services. He used to teach engineering in such universities as University of Nevada in Reno, University of California in Santa Barbara, Texas A&M University and his alma mater. In 1980 professor Allen have coauthored a book called Introduction to the Theory and Design of Active Filters and four years later coauthored another one called Switched Capacitor Circuits. Three years later, he became a coauthor of CMOS Analog Circuit Design and another three years later VLSI-Design Techniques for Analog and Digital Circuits of which he was a coauthor as well. Currently he works as an editor for Integration-The VLSI Journal, and Analog Integrated Circuits and Signal Processing and is a fellow at the Institute of Electrical and Electronics Engineers.

References

21st-century American engineers
Year of birth missing (living people)
Living people